Giratagh or Girat’agh or Giratag may refer to:
Nerkin Giratagh, Armenia
Verin Giratagh, Armenia